The Legend Of Ochi is an upcoming American fantasy adventure film written and directed by Isaiah Saxon in his feature film debut. The film stars Willem Dafoe, Emily Watson, Finn Wolfhard and Helena Zengel.

Cast
 Willem Dafoe
 Emily Watson
 Finn Wolfhard
 Helena Zengel

Production

Development
On November 10, 2021, it was reported that Isaiah Saxon would write and direct The Legend Of Ochi, a fantasy adventure film starring Willem Dafoe, Emily Watson, Finn Wolfhard and Helena Zengel.

Filming
Some scenes of the film have been shot in Transylvania, in the Apuseni Mountains, at the Bâlea Lake and on the Transfăgărășan road. The shooting started in Romania on November 1, 2021 and continue at the Castel Film Studios till December, 15, 2021.

References

External links
 

Upcoming films
A24 (company) films
2020s English-language films
2020s American films
American fantasy adventure films